Giovanni Battista Giusti was a scientific- instrument maker. Giusti worked as a scientific-instrument maker in Florence for the Grand Duke's workshops around the mid-sixteenth century.

References

External links 

Italian scientific instrument makers
Scientists from Florence
Date of birth unknown
Date of death unknown